The Morokodo are an ethnic group numbering over 40,000 people living in the South Sudanese state of Western Equatoria. They speak Morokodo language, a Central Sudanic language

References

Ethnic groups in South Sudan